The following is a list of Teen Choice Award winners and nominees for Choice Music - Rock Group. It was briefly given out as Choice Music – Rock Artist from 2010 to 2011 before being retitled in 2012. It was discontinued between 2015-2016 until it was given out in 2017 as Choice Music – Rock Artist.

Winners and nominees

2000s

2010s

References

Rock music awards
Rock Group